The women's shot put event  at the 1995 IAAF World Indoor Championships was held on 11 March.

Doping disqualification
Larisa Peleshenko of Russia originally won the event and was awarded the gold medal, but was later disqualified for doping.

Results

References

Shot
Shot put at the World Athletics Indoor Championships
1995 in women's athletics